Zvika Brakerski is an Israeli mathematician, know for his work on homomorphic encryption, particularly in developing the foundations of the second generation FHE schema, for which he was awarded the 2022 Gödel Prize. Brakerski is an Associate Professor in the Department of Computer Science and Applied Mathematics at the Weizmann Institute of Science.

Research
In 2012 Brakerski published a paper at the Annual Cryptology Conference "Fully homomorphic encryption without modulus switching from classical GapSVP
Authors", this formed the basis of the Brakerski-Gentry-Vaikuntanathan (BGV) - for which they were jointly awarded the Gödel Prize - and BFV Fully Homomorphic Encryption (FHE) schema. The two dominant second-generation FHE schema.

References

Year of birth missing (living people)
Living people
Place of birth missing (living people)
Israeli mathematicians
Academic staff of Weizmann Institute of Science
Gödel Prize laureates